Kuhl's creek frog or large-headed frog (Limnonectes kuhlii) is a species of frog in the family Dicroglossidae.

Species complex
L. kuhlii was once believed to have a broad distribution in Northeast India (Assam) and Southeast Asia, but a phylogenetic analysis in 2010 demonstrated that there were at least 16 morphologically similar, but genetically distinct evolutionary lineages subsumed under the name.

Already, several populations that were previously identified as L. kuhlii have been formally described as new species: L. fujianensis and L. bannaensis of China, L. nguyenorum and L. quangninhensis of Vietnam, L. jarujini, L. taylori, L. isanensis, and L. megastomias of Thailand, and L. sisikdagu from Indonesia. The original specimen of L. kuhlii was found in Java, and that is the only area where the "true" species occurs with certainty.

Phylogeny
Below is a phylogeny of species within the L. kuhlii species complex (McLeod, et al. 2015).

References

External links

Amphibian and Reptiles of Peninsular Malaysia - Limnonectes kuhlii

Limnonectes
Fauna of Brunei
Amphibians of Myanmar
Amphibians of Cambodia
Amphibians of China
Frogs of India
Amphibians of Indonesia
Amphibians of Laos
Amphibians of Malaysia
Amphibians of Thailand
Amphibians of Vietnam
Taxonomy articles created by Polbot
Amphibians described in 1838